Idiorrhythmic monasticism is a form of monastic life in Christianity.

It was the original form of monastic life in Christianity, as exemplified by St. Anthony of Egypt ( 250–355) and is the opposite of cenobitic monasticism in that instead of communal ownership, the monk lives alone, often in isolation. Philosophically it consisted of a hermit's total withdrawal from society, usually in the desert, and the constant practice of mental prayer. The word idiorrhythmic comes from two Greek words, idios for "particular" and rhythmos for "rule", so the word can be translated as meaning "following one's own devices".

It was first developed by St. Anthony of Egypt ( 250–355) and was practised at Mount Athos, Greece until 1992.

See also
 Hermitage
 Monastic cell
 Lavra
 Monasticism
 Order (religious)
 Skete

References

Christian monasticism
Mount Athos
Catholic orders and societies by type